Zlatorog Arena is an indoor sporting arena located in Celje, Slovenia which opened in December 2003. The arena has a capacity for 5,191 spectators.

Zlatorog Arena hosts the home games of handball club RK Celje. In 2013, it hosted the Group C of preliminary round at EuroBasket 2013. It also hosted the 2022 European Women's Handball Championship preliminary rounds.

See also
 List of indoor arenas in Slovenia

References

External links

Official page of the management company ZPO Celje

Handball venues in Slovenia
Indoor arenas in Slovenia
Basketball venues in Slovenia
Sports venues completed in 2003
2003 establishments in Slovenia
Sport in Celje
Buildings and structures in Celje
21st-century architecture in Slovenia